Suzanne Luttikhuis (born ) is a retired Dutch female volleyball player. She was part of the Netherlands women's national volleyball team.

She participated at the 1997 FIVB Volleyball World Grand Prix, and at the 1998 FIVB Volleyball Women's World Championship in Japan.

References

1977 births
Living people
Dutch women's volleyball players
Place of birth missing (living people)